Part-Time Spy (lit. "Temporary Special Forces") is a 2017 South Korean action comedy film starring Kang Ye-won and Han Chae-ah. It was released on March 16, 2017.

Premise
A former national security agency contract worker works with an undercover policewoman to recover stolen money from a voice phishing syndicate.

Cast
 Kang Ye-won as Jang Young-shil 
 Han Chae-ah as Na Jung-an
 Namkoong Min as Min-seok
 Jo Jae-yoon as Deputy Department Head Park 
 Kwak Ja-hyeong as Chief Financial Officer
 Kim Min-kyo as Department Head Yang
 Shin Se-hwi as Lee Ji-eun
 Kim Sung-eun as Eun-jung
 Lee Jung-min as Song-yi 
 Nam Seong-jin as Chief Goo
 Dong Hyun-bae as Jae-yong
 Ryoo Seong-hyeon as City Hall Section Chief

Reception

References

External links

Part-Time Spy at Naver Movies 

2017 films
South Korean action comedy films
South Korean spy comedy films
2017 action comedy films
2010s spy comedy films
2017 comedy films
2010s South Korean films